Dongshan District was a former district in Guangzhou, Guangdong, China located to the west of Tianhe District and the east of Yuexiu District. It was the political and cultural centre of Guangdong Province and noted for its high-quality education. The district was established in 1960, then merged with Yuexiu District in 2005.

References

1960 establishments in China
2008 disestablishments in China
States and territories established in 1960
States and territories disestablished in 2008
Yuexiu District
Former districts of Guangzhou